Giselle Lucretia Muñoz (born 11 September 1984) is an Argentine para table tennis player who competes in international level events. She has participated at the Paralympic Games five times.

References

1984 births
Living people
Sportspeople from Buenos Aires
Paralympic table tennis players of Argentina
Argentine female table tennis players
Table tennis players at the 2000 Summer Paralympics
Table tennis players at the 2004 Summer Paralympics
Table tennis players at the 2008 Summer Paralympics
Table tennis players at the 2012 Summer Paralympics
Table tennis players at the 2016 Summer Paralympics
Medalists at the 2007 Parapan American Games
Medalists at the 2011 Parapan American Games
Medalists at the 2015 Parapan American Games
Medalists at the 2019 Parapan American Games